Paloma Gay y Blasco is a social anthropologist specialising in gender and Spanish Gitanos (Roma/Gypsies).  She is a full-time lecturer at University of St Andrews and has published two books and several articles, including Gypsies in Madrid: Sex, Gender, and the Performance of Identity (1999 Oxford, Berg) and with Huon Wardle "How to Read Ethnography" (2008 London Routledge).

References

Profile at the website of the University of St Andrews

Academics of the University of St Andrews
Living people
Year of birth missing (living people)
Place of birth missing (living people)